Ragga Dee, born Daniel Kazibwe, is a Ugandan musician and politician. He contested for mayor of Kampala in the 2016 general elections. Currently, Ragga Dee serves as An Arts Administrator representing Art on the Private Sector Foundation Executive as well as Being Chairman National Culture Forum.

Early life and Music
Dee was born in 1968 to George William Kyeyune. He started his music career in 1988. His music is an amalgamation of do reggae, ragga, hip-hop, and Lingala. He was Ragga Artist of the Year at the Pearl of Africa Music Awards in 2004 and 2005 and won best video in 2006. He has 18 albums. He gained fame in the early 1990s with hits like Bamusakata and Mukwano while part of a group called Da Hommies. He has won the Pearl of Africa Music Award for best Ragga artiste of the year as well as the Best Male Artist of the year and was profiled on BBC. In 2005 his reggae Album was crowned the Best Album at the Golden Awards in Uganda.

Songs
Ndigida
Parliament
NO. 9
Cissy
kabonge kko
Mbawe
Oyagala cash
Sirikawo baby feat. Mention Summer
 "Mpeta"

References

External links 
"I'll win Kampala mayoral race by 65% - Ragga Dee"

1973 births
21st-century Ugandan male singers
20th-century Ugandan male singers
Living people
People from Kampala
Ganda people